Ermin Velić (born April 1, 1959 in Jajce) is a Yugoslav former handball player who won bronze medal in the 1988 Summer Olympics.

External links
Profile

1959 births
Living people
Yugoslav male handball players
Handball players at the 1988 Summer Olympics
Olympic handball players of Yugoslavia
Olympic bronze medalists for Yugoslavia
Olympic medalists in handball
Medalists at the 1988 Summer Olympics